Alvin Wolfe is an American anthropologist, a Distinguished University Professor Emeritus from University of South Florida, and an Elected Fellow of the American Association for the Advancement of Science.

References

Year of birth missing (living people)
Living people
Fellows of the American Association for the Advancement of Science
University of South Florida faculty
American anthropologists
Northwestern University alumni
University of Nebraska alumni